PongSats are high-altitude "near-space" missions that hold a probe or other project that can fit inside a ping-pong (table tennis) ball. The launch program is run by a volunteer organization, JP Aerospace (which also provided balloon launch services for the Space Chair.)

JP Aerospace succeeded in its first launch of PongSat missions, with a balloon-launched rocket (AKA a rockoon), at the West Texas Spaceport near Fort Stockton, in October 2002. The launcher reached 100,000 feet with 64 hosted PongSats.

Many of the flights have been funded through a KickStarter crowdfunding campaign.
Although many PongSats contain things like food items, simply because schoolchildren are curious about the result, other missions include "multiple sensors and complex mini-computers".
It's been described by its founder as part of "America's Other Space Program," but also as one that relies "primarily on volunteers and helium."

According to founder John Powell, the PongSat launch program is very global, with payloads delivered to JP Aerospace from "Poland, India, Japan, Slovenia, Germany, Belgium, Turkey, China, Australia, Indonesia."

References

External links 

 
 Pongsat Guide
 
 PongSats and MiniCubes (pdf) Presentation at UNSW ACSER Cubesat Innovation Workshop, 2017-04-19/20
 Weekly Space Hangout: December 16, 2020 – John Powell Tells Us About PongSats and Airship to Orbit
 "PongSats: The World's Space Program". Michael Molitch-Hou. Feb 20, 2013. 3dprintingindustry.com
 "PongSats take student science projects to new heights", Ben Coxworth, New Atlas. July 27, 2012

Balloon-borne experiments
Educational technology non-profits